Mistress were a British extreme metal band from Birmingham, England. The members of this five-piece band adopted pseudonyms as stage-names including: Drunken and Misery on guitars, Dirty Von Arse on bass, Dave Cunt on vocals and Migg on drums. Dave Cunt (a.k.a. Dave Hunt) is also a member of Anaal Nathrakh and Migg (a.k.a. Mick Kenney) is in several other bands, including Anaal Nathrakh, Exploder, Fukpig and Frost. Misery (Paul Kenney, Micks Older Brother), also plays in Fukpig and Kroh. Mistress announced their split in 2008.

History

The band formed at the end of the 1990s in Birmingham and began playing their own take on the vitriolic Iron Monkey / Eyehategod sludge sound. The band became noted for their offensive, yet intellectual lyrics and incredibly heavy, dirty, downtuned sound.

In 2001, Mistress released two demos, entitled Fuck Off and Lord Worm, which got them signed to the underground Rage of Achilles extreme music label. Their first full-length album for the record label was the self-titled Mistress in April 2002, which received broadly good reviews from extreme music publications. The follow-up to this, October 2003's Mistress II: The Chronovisor, helped to more firmly establish them as a metal band, along with their growing live reputation.

The band's ability to create filthy sonic rage ensured that they were soon picked up by the much larger Nottingham-based Earache Records, who issued Mistress' third full-length album In Disgust We Trust in June 2005. In the same year, Earache also re-issued the band's first two albums. After being dropped from the Earache roster during 2006, the band were signed to Mick Kenney and Shane Embury's new record label, FETO Records. On 23 April 2007, they released their fourth studio album through FETO Records, entitled The Glory Bitches of Doghead, which has dropped the sludge sound in favour of enhancing the grind elements. The album also has an ambient track running throughout (consisting of various noises, including what seems to be rain) created by Misery, which can be heard distinctly between songs, adding depth to the vicious music being played.

Mistress appeared on the Christmas special of Never Mind the Buzzcocks performing Christmas carols in sludge metal.

Mistress announced their demise in March 2008.

One last gig 
Mistress performed one last gig on 24 October 2009 at Damnation Festival.

Members 
 Dave Hunt (also known as Dave Cunt, Vitriol) — vocals
 Misery (Paul Kenney) — guitar
 Drunken (Duncan Wilkins) — guitar
 Dirty Von Arse — bass
 Mick Kenney (also known as Migg, Irrumator) — drums
 Earl Robinson — bass for first demo and first few gigs

Discography

Demos 
 Fuck Off (2001)
 Lord Worm (2001)

Albums 
 Mistress (2002)
 Mistress II: The Chronovisor (2003)
 In Disgust We Trust (2005)
 The Glory Bitches of Doghead (2007)

External links 
 Official website (archived)
 
 kvltsite.com review of The Glory Bitches of Doghead

Musical groups established in 1999
Musical groups disestablished in 2008
English death metal musical groups
Earache Records artists
Musical groups from Birmingham, West Midlands
Sludge metal musical groups
English grindcore musical groups
1999 establishments in England